Mr. Holland's Opus is a 1995 American drama film directed by Stephen Herek, produced by Ted Field, Robert W. Cort, and Michael Nolin, and written by Patrick Sheane Duncan. The film stars Richard Dreyfuss in the title role of Glenn Holland, a dedicated high-school music teacher who attempts to compose his own music while struggling to balance his job and life with his wife and profoundly deaf son. The cast also includes Glenne Headly, Olympia Dukakis, William H. Macy, and Jay Thomas.

The film was nominated for the Golden Globe Award for Best Screenplay. Richard Dreyfuss received nominations for the Golden Globe Award for Best Actor – Motion Picture Drama and the Academy Award for Best Actor.

Plot
In the fall of 1964, 30-year-old Glenn Holland is a successful and talented musician and composer from Portland, Oregon. He switches gears, taking a position as a music teacher at John F. Kennedy High School so that he can spend more time with his young wife Iris and work on his symphony. The film covers his 30-year teaching career, set amongst the changes in American society.

Holland at first struggles in his new job, but learns how to connect with his students by using rock and roll and other popular music to convince them that music is a fun and worthwhile pursuit. He becomes a popular teacher at the school and rises to the task of creating a school marching band with help from the football coach, Bill Meister, with whom he becomes lifelong friends. Holland persuades principal Helen Jacobs to maintain funding for the school's arts programs, despite a shrinking budget and the objections of vice principal Gene Wolters.

The time Holland devotes to his classes, the marching band, orchestra, productions and mentoring both struggling and talented students leaves him little time to work on his symphony, or to spend with his family. When his son, Cole, is found to be deaf, he is severely disappointed that he will never be able to share his love of music. He fails to learn American Sign Language properly, leaving him unable to communicate with his son and creating a rift between him and Iris, who has to raise Cole mostly by herself. As the years progress, Holland grows closer to his students at Kennedy High and more distant from his own son. An argument with his teenage son finally makes Holland realize the error of his ways and he learns to communicate with his son and  help him visualize the music he can't hear, and repairs his relationship with his wife.

In 1995, Wolters (who is now the principal) shuts down the school's arts programs, citing further cuts from the Education Board and the need to prioritize reading, writing and math, and Holland is laid off as a result. Holland makes an impassioned plea to the Board to no avail and becomes despondent, believing that his teaching career has amounted to nothing. On his last day, Holland's wife and son, now a teacher himself, help him clear out his office and take him to the auditorium. It is packed full of current and former students who greet him with a standing ovation. Gertrude Lang, a struggling clarinetist from Holland's first year teaching, now Governor of Oregon, gives a speech praising Mr. Holland, that his legacy is more than just the symphony; it is all the people he has helped and influenced over 30 years. She joins past members of the school's orchestra, who have been practicing the symphony in secret, on stage. Mr. Holland conducts them in its premiere performance.

Cast
 Richard Dreyfuss as Glenn Holland, a composer who becomes a music teacher at John F. Kennedy High School.
 Glenne Headly as Iris Holland, Glenn's wife.
 Jay Thomas as Bill Meister, the gym teacher and coach of John F. Kennedy High School's football team who befriends Glenn.
 Olympia Dukakis as Principal Helen Jacobs, the principal of John F. Kennedy High School, who retires in 1972.
 William H. Macy as Vice Principal Gene Wolters, the vice-principal of John F. Kennedy High School who later becomes principal in 1972.
 Jean Louisa Kelly as Rowena Morgan, a talented singer who seeks to embark on a showbiz career.
 Joanna Gleason as Gertrude Lang, an aspiring clarinet player who eventually becomes the governor of Oregon.
 Alicia Witt as younger Gertrude Lang
 Damon Whitaker as Bobby Tidd, one of Glenn's students.
 Forest Whitaker as adult Bobby Tidd (uncredited)
 Terrence Howard as Louis Russ, a football player and wrestler who becomes a bass drum player in the marching band.
 Alexandra Boyd as Sarah Olmstead, a drama teacher.
 Anthony Natale as Coltrane "Cole" Holland (age 28), Glenn and Iris' son, who is 90% deaf.
 Joseph Anderson as Coltrane "Cole" Holland (age 15)
 Nicholas John Renner as Coltrane "Cole" Holland (age 6)
 Beth Maitland as Deaf School Principal, the principal of a deaf school that Cole is enrolled in.

Production
The movie was written by Patrick Sheane Duncan, directed by Stephen Herek, and was filmed in and around Portland, Oregon, with many exterior and interior scenes taking place at Ulysses S. Grant High School. Other scenes were filmed in Portland's St. Johns neighborhood and Hollywood District.

Archival footage
Archival footage seen in the film includes:

 Martin Luther King Jr.'s speech
 Robert and John F. Kennedy
 Woodstock
 Vietnam War
 Richard Nixon's resignation speech
 The Rocky Horror Picture Show
 Saturday Night Fever
 Stop Making Sense
 Murder of John Lennon
 Disco Demolition Night at Comiskey Park

Music
The film features an orchestral score by Michael Kamen and many pieces of classical music. Kamen also wrote An American Symphony ("Mr. Holland's Opus"), the work on which Mr. Holland is shown working throughout the movie.  Kamen's arrangement won the 1997 Grammy for Best Instrumental Arrangement.

Soundtrack releases
Two soundtrack albums were released for this film in January 1996. One is the original motion picture score, and includes all of the original music written for the film by Michael Kamen. The second album is a collection of popular music featured in the film:

 "Visions of a Sunset" – Shawn Stockman (of Boyz II Men)
 "1-2-3" – Len Barry
 "A Lover's Concerto" – The Toys
 "Keep On Running" – Spencer Davis Group
 "Uptight (Everything's Alright)" – Stevie Wonder
 "Imagine" – John Lennon
 "The Pretender" – Jackson Browne
 "Someone to Watch Over Me" – Julia Fordham
 "I Got a Woman" – Ray Charles
 "Beautiful Boy (Darling Boy)" – John Lennon
 "Cole's Song" – Julian Lennon and Tim Renwick
 An American Symphony ("Mr. Holland's Opus") – London Metropolitan Orchestra and Michael Kamen

Reception

Box office
In the United States, gross domestic takings totaled US$82,569,971. International takings are estimated at US$23,700,000, for a gross worldwide takings of $106,269,971. Rental totals reached $36,550,000 in the US. Although the film is included among 1995 box-office releases (it ranks as the 14th-most successful film of that year), it was only released in a few theatres in New York and Los Angeles on December 29, 1995, because Disney felt, accurately, that Richard Dreyfuss' performance had a good chance of getting an Oscar nomination if it beat that year's in-theatre deadline.

Critical
The film holds a 75% "Fresh" rating from 28 reviews at Rotten Tomatoes. The site's consensus states: "A feel-good story brought to life by a terrific ensemble cast, Mr. Holland's Opus plucks the heartstrings without shame -- and with undeniable skill." CinemaScore reported that audiences gave the film a rare "A+" grade. The New York Times film review cited Dreyfuss for "a warm and really touching performance"; Variety also called his performance "quite effective and surprisingly restrained". Variety further noted the "nostalgic aura" that permeates the film, "which encourages viewers to think fondly of — and pay tribute to — the one teacher in their lives who made a difference". Roger Ebert gave the film 3 1/2 out of 4 stars, commending its starring and supporting casts and agreeing with the film's message of the ability of high school teachers to inspire their students, as well as the importance of cultural offerings on the curriculum.

Writer Patrick Sheane Duncan was nominated for the Golden Globe Award for Best Screenplay at the 53rd Golden Globe Awards. Dreyfuss was nominated for the Academy Award for Best Actor and the Golden Globe Award for Best Actor – Motion Picture Drama.

Accolades
The film is recognized by American Film Institute in this list:
 2006: AFI's 100 Years...100 Cheers – Nominated

The Mr. Holland's Opus Foundation
Inspired by the motion picture, its composer, Michael Kamen, founded The Mr. Holland's Opus Foundation  in 1996 as his commitment to the future of music education.

Musical version
A world premiere musical version adapted from Duncan's screenplay was staged from August 12 to September 17, 2022 at the Ogunquit Playhouse in Ogunquit, Maine. Book, lyrics and direction are by Tony Award winner BD Wong with music by Wayne Barker.

See also
 List of films featuring the deaf and hard of hearing
 Dead Poets Society, a 1989 American teen comedy-drama film which Mr. Holland's Opus was marketed as a sequel to in Taiwan, renamed Dead Poets Society 1996.
 "", a 2017 episode of the twenty-ninth season of The Simpsons which spoofs Mr. Holland's Opus.

References

External links

 
 
 
 
 The Mr. Holland's Opus Foundation
 

1995 films
1995 drama films
American drama films
American Sign Language films
Films about classical music and musicians
Films about composers
Films about deaf people
Films about educators
Films directed by Stephen Herek
Films set in the 1960s
Films set in the 1970s
Films set in the 1980s
Films set in the 1990s
Films shot in Portland, Oregon
Films set in Portland, Oregon
Hollywood Pictures films
Interscope Communications films
PolyGram Filmed Entertainment films
Films set in schools
Films scored by Michael Kamen
1990s English-language films
1990s American films